The Dahae, also known as the Daae, Dahas or Dahaeans (Ancient Greek:  ,  ,  ,  ;;;) were an ancient Eastern Iranian nomadic tribal  confederation, who inhabited the steppes of Central Asia.

Identification

The scholar Y. A. Zadneprovskiy has instead suggested that the Dahae were descendants of the Massagetae.

Location
The Dahae initially lived in the north-eastern part of the Persian Achaemenid Empire, in the arid steppes of the Karakum Desert near Margiana, alongside the Saka groups and the Sogdians and Chorasmians, and immediately to the north of Hyrcania.

During late 4th and early 3rd centuries BCE, the Dahae, and especially their constituent tribe of the Parni, had settled along the southern and southwestern fringes of the Karakum desert, and by the mid-3rd century BCE they had moved west and had settled along the southeastern shores of the Caspian Sea, in the lands to the north of Hyrcania. Two other Dahae tribes, the Xanthioi and the Pissouroi, lived further east till the regions to the north of Areia.

Name
The name of the Dahae, attested in the Old Persian form , is derived from a Saka language name meaning "man," based on the common practice among various peoples of calling themselves "man" in their own languages. This term is attested in the Khotanese form . The Dahae were a nomadic people, and no known sedentary settlement can be attributed to them.

The scholar David Gordon White has instead suggested that the name of the Dahae meant "Stranglers," and was derived from the Proto-Indo-European root , from which he also derived the name of the Dacians.

History
A splinter  group appears to have migrated at an early date across the Iranian plateau, where they had joined the Persian people who lived in its southwestern part, with the Greek historian Herodotus later referring to them as one of the nomadic Persian tribes, along with the Mardians, Dropicans, and Sagartians.

The  were in control of the traffic between Chorasmia in the north and Parthia and Hyrcania in the south.

According to the Babylonian historian Berossus, the founder of the Persian Achaemenid Empire, Cyrus, died fighting against the Dahae. According to the Iranologist Muhammad Dandamayev, Berossus identified the Dahae rather than the Massagetae as Cyrus's killers because they had replaced the Massagetae as the most famous nomadic tribe of Central Asia long before Berossus's time, although some scholars identified the Dahae as being identical with the Massagetae or as one of their sub-groups.

The  fought within the left wing of the Achaemenid army along with the Bactrians and the Saka against Alexander the Great at Gaugamela in 331 BCE.

The Dahae may have invaded Margiana and Areia around 300 BCE, and during this invasion they destroyed the towns of Alexandreia and Heracleia located in these respective two countries.

During late 4th and early 3rd centuries BCE, the Dahae, and especially their constituent tribe of the Parni, had settled along the southern and southwestern fringes of the Karakum desert, and by the mid-3rd century BCE they had moved west and had settled along the southeastern shores of the Caspian Sea, in the lands to the north of Hyrcania. Two other Dahae tribes, the Xanthioi and the Pissouroi, lived further east till the regions to the north of Areia.

During the middle of the 3rd century itself, the Parni had moved into Hyrcania, where they lived along the Ochus river. Their leader, Arsaces, would found the Parthian Empire.

During the 2nd century BCE, both the Dahae who still lived in the steppes and the Parthian Empire, as well as the Chorasmians, and Sogdians sent embassies to the Emperor Wu of the Han dynasty which was ruling China.

Legacy

See also 
Massagetae
Parthian Empire
Saka
Scythian cultures

References

Sources 

 
 

 
Iranian nomads
Historical Iranian peoples
History of Turkmenistan